Perazhagan is a 2004 Indian Tamil-language film directed by Sasi Shanker and produced by AVM Productions, starring Suriya and Jyothika, each in dual roles. The supporting cast includes Vivek, Manorama and Manobala. The film, which is a remake of the 2002 Malayalam film Kunjikoonan, released on 7 May 2004. For his performance, Suriya won the Filmfare Award for Best Actor – Tamil.

Plot 
Chinna is a kindhearted village youth with a hunchback and is lauded for selfless service to others. He covers up his disability with humor and optimism. Unmindful of his looks, Chinna goes around looking for a suitable bride with the help of his friend Kuzhandhaisamy, a marriage assembler. Brushing aside many insults hurled at him, he carries on with his life.

In contrast is Karthik (also Surya), a violent college student who madly loves his classmate Priya. She meets Chinna, who assures her that he would get her married to the man of her dreams. Priya and Karthik plan to elope with Chinna's help as her father rejects Karthik. However, she is killed in a frac by Varadhan, a gangster, as revenge against Priya's father DCP Nair, who arrested and assaulted him. She dies in Karthik's arms with Nair watching and he arrests him thinking he's responsible for Priya's murder. Chinna saw Varadhan killing Priya, but Varadhan tells that he will be killed if he tells anyone what he saw. After Karthik is jailed as Priya's killer, Chinna pleads Nair and tells the truth behind Priya's murder. Meanwhile, Chinna comes across an orphaned, poor, blind girl Shenbagam. He wins over her heart by helping her out when her brother died.

After his efforts, she gains her vision (Priya's eyes are transplanted to her). This results in a tussle between Chinna and Karthik as to whom Shenbagam now belongs. However, fearing his looks, Chinna decides to give way to Karthik and ends up staying in a temple where Kuzhandhaisamy finds him and brings him to Shenbagam. Shenbagam does not care of looks and accepts him. Before their marriage, Varadhan returns to avenge Chinna. Karthik remembers Priya and avenges her death by brutally killing Varadhan. Karthik approves  Chinna and Shenbagam's wedding before being sent to jail. The film ends with the couple spending their honeymoon in Ooty.

Cast 

 Suriya as Chinna (Prem Kumar) / Karthik (in dual role)
 Jyothika as Priya Nair / Shenbagam (in dual role; voices dubbed by Savitha Reddy and Rohini respectively)
 Vivek as Marriage assembler Kuzhandhaisamy "Kuzhandha", Chinna's best friend
 Ramji as Rajesh
 Manicka Vinayagam as Karthik's father
 Kalairani as Karthik's mother
 Devan as DSP Nair, Priya's father
 Bobby as Varadhan
 Manorama as Pattamma, Chinna's grandmother
 Sukumari as Priya's grandmother
 Thalaivasal Vijay as Shenbagam's brother
 Manobala as Tea Shop Owner
 Muthukaalai
 Malavika in a cameo role as Chinna's dream wife in the song "Ambuli Mama"
 Chaams as Groom (uncredited)

Production 

AVM decided to remake Malayalam film Kunjikoonan and bought the remake rights after being impressed with it. Sasi Shankar who made the Malayalam original was chosen to direct the remake too. Unlike the Malayalam original, where two female characters were played by two different actresses, in Tamil Jyothika enacted both the roles.

Soundtrack 
The soundtrack was composed by Yuvan Shankar Raja, with Palani Bharathi, Kabilan, Pa. Vijay, Thamarai and Snehan writing the lyrics of each one song.

Reception 
Sify wrote, "The film makes you laugh and cry at the same time. However the highlight of the film is Surya as Chinna and he is extraordinary. Here is one of his most lovable performances as the handicap, though as the morose Karthik, he just passes muster. Jyothika is a revelation (also in her first dual role) as the bubbly Priya and the blind Shenbagham. In her first de-glamorised role as Shenbagham she has proved her histrionics. Vivek for a change has a full length role and he brings the house down with his one-liners. Music by Yuvan is average but the background score is good. Director Sasi Sankar has to be applauded for making a feel-good film without any violence, vulgarity or even bad words".

Indiaglitz wrote, "Surya deserves appreciation for his astounding performance. He is at his best, be it humor or action [...] After a long gap, Vivek has succeeded in evoking laughter. A tailor-made role for Vivek in which he really excels". Visual Dasan of Kalki praised Suriya for showing difference in dual roles and the story had unexpected twists. He concluded the review by appreciating AVM for making a film without including an item number. Malathi Rangarajan of The Hindu wrote, "At no point are you allowed to feel that it is the same actor who is playing the physically challenged Chinna and the rough, ardently-in-love Karthik — therein lies [Perazhagan's] strength".

Accolades

Dropped remake 
Upon release, NP Films bought the Telugu remake rights of the film. However, the remake was not made and the Tamil film was instead dubbed in Telugu as Sundarangadu, and released on 26 November 2004.

Legacy 
Suriya reprises his role as Chinna in the song "Palla Palla" in Ayan.

References

External links 
 

2000s Tamil-language films
2004 films
Films about disability in India
Films directed by Sasi Shanker
Films scored by Yuvan Shankar Raja
Tamil remakes of Malayalam films